The Curious Incident of the Dog in the Night-Time is a play by Simon Stephens based on the novel of the same name by Mark Haddon. During its premiere run, the play tied the record for winning the most Olivier Awards (seven), including Best New Play at the 2013 ceremony (this record was surpassed by Harry Potter and the Cursed Child in 2017 with nine wins). The play is a National Theatre Production, in association with Frantic Assembly, who specialised in the movement direction. 

The play premiered on 2 August 2012 in the Cottesloe Theatre at the Royal National Theatre in London before transferring to the Apollo Theatre in the West End on 12 March 2013. The production won 7 Olivier Awards in 2013 (including Best New Play), at the time equaling the record with Matilda the Musical in 2012, before both were surpassed by Harry Potter and the Cursed Child in 2017 with 9 awards. During a performance on 19 December 2013, the ceiling of the Apollo Theatre collapsed causing the production to close. It reopened on 9 July 2014 at the Gielgud Theatre. The play closed at the Gielgud on 3 June 2017.

The Broadway production debuted at the Ethel Barrymore Theatre on 5 October 2014 and closed on 4 September 2016. It won the 2015 Drama Desk Award for Outstanding Play, 2015 Outer Critics Circle Award Outstanding New Broadway Play, the 2015 Drama League Award for Outstanding Production of a Broadway or Off-Broadway Play, and the 2015 Tony Award for Best Play.

Mickey Rowe was the first openly autistic actor to authentically play Christopher Boone in the Curious Incident of the Dog in the Night-Time. He documented this experience in the book Fearlessly Different: An Autistic Actor's Journey to Broadway's Biggest Stage.

The story concerns a mystery surrounding the death of a neighbour's dog that is investigated by young Christopher Boone, who is autistic, and his relationships with his parents and school mentor. The play reworked the source material by changing its voice and presenting the story as a play-within-a-play. The play has received a generally warm reception, with most critics impressed by its ability to convey the point of view of the young protagonist and the compassion of his school mentor. Critics also generally spoke highly of the visual effects employed during the show.

Characters

 Christopher John Francis Boone: the 15-year-old protagonist
 Mr. Ed Boone: Christopher's father, a boiler engineer.
 Mrs. Judy Boone: Christopher's mother.
 Siobhan: Christopher's para-professional and mentor at school.
 Voice One: The actor in this role also plays:
 Mrs. Shears: Christopher's neighbour.
 Mrs. Gascoyne: the head of Christopher's school.
 Woman on Train
 Shopkeeper
 Voice Two: The actor in this role also plays:
 Roger Shears:  Mrs Shear's ex-husband.
 Mr. Wise: one of Christopher's neighbours.
 Duty Sergeant
 Man behind Counter
 Drunk One
 Voice Three: The actor in this role also plays:
 A Policeman
 Mr. Thompson: one of Christopher's neighbours
 London Policeman
 Man with Socks
 Drunk Two
 Voice Four: The actor in this role also plays:
 Reverend Peters: a priest and teacher at Christopher's school.
 Uncle Terry: Christopher's uncle
 Station Policeman
 Station Guard
 Voice Five: The actor in this role also plays:
 No. 37
 Lady in Street
 Information
 Punk Girl
 Voice Six: The actor in this role also plays:
 Mrs. Alexander: An old lady, one of Christopher's neighbours.
 Posh Woman

Plot
The play involves a significant reworking of the source material. Rather than present the story in the first-person narrative as the original novel did, the play is presented as a reading of Boone's own writing, read aloud in segments by his teacher. The result is that the play is presented as a play-within-a-play.

Set in Swindon and London, the story concerns 15-year-old Christopher John Francis Boone, a mathematical genius with an unspecified autism spectrum disorder, although his condition is never explicitly stated in the play. The titular curious incident is the mystery surrounding the death of Wellington, his neighbor Mrs. Shears’ poodle, after Christopher finds the dog speared with a garden fork.

While trying to discover who killed Wellington, he encounters resistance from many neighbours, but mostly from his widowed father, Ed. Christopher argues to himself that many rules are made to be broken, so he continues to search for an answer. During his investigation, Christopher happens across letters from his mother, Judy, dated after her alleged death. Ed admits that Judy is alive and living in London with their neighbor with whom she had an affair; he had fabricated the story about her passing away from a heart attack two years prior. He also admits that he killed Wellington in a fit of fury after an argument with Mrs. Shears. Distraught and fearing for his life, Christopher heads to London to find and live with his mother, traveling by himself for the first time in his life. He finds the journey overstimulating and stressful, but eventually succeeds and is welcomed by his mother. However, his ambitions lead him back to Swindon, where he wants to sit an A Level mathematics exam. Christopher achieves the best possible result and gradually reconciles with his father.

In a short scene after the curtain call, Christopher reappears to brilliantly solve his "favourite question" from the mathematics exam.

Productions

National Theatre 
Adapted by Simon Stephens and directed by Marianne Elliott, the show premièred at the Royal National Theatre's Cottesloe Theatre on 2 August 2012. The performance there was played in the round. The production starred Luke Treadaway as Christopher, Niamh Cusack as his inspirational teacher Siobhan, Nicola Walker as his mother Judy, Paul Ritter as his father Ed and Una Stubbs as Mrs. Alexander. The production, which ran until late October 2012, was broadcast live to cinemas worldwide on Thursday 6 September 2012 through the National Theatre Live programme.

West End
The show transferred to the West End's Apollo Theatre in March 2013. Performances began on 1 March, with an official opening on 12 March. Seán Gleeson and Holly Aird joined the cast as Christopher's parents.

On 19 December 2013, during a performance, part of the Apollo Theatre's roof collapsed, injuring nearly 80 people. As a result, all further performances were cancelled and a new theatre was sought. The Apollo's balcony required extensive repairs. In February 2014, the producers staged 8 free lunchtime performances for audiences from 14 secondary schools at the Stratford Old Town Hall. The production finally re-opened at the nearby Gielgud Theatre, beginning previews on 24 June 2014, with its official opening night on 9 July.

The West End production closed on 3 June 2017, after playing over 1,600 performances.

The production returned to the West End at the Piccadilly Theatre from 29 November 2018 (with an official opening night on 11 December) for a limited run until 27 April 2019.

Broadway
The play opened on Broadway at the Ethel Barrymore Theatre on 5 October 2014, after beginning previews on 10 September. It is again produced by the Royal National Theatre and directed by Elliott. The original Broadway cast included Alex Sharp (in his first professional role ever) as Christopher, Enid Graham as his mother Judy, Ian Barford as his father Ed, and Francesca Faridany as Siobhan. The production is choreographed by Scott Graham and Steven Hoggett.

The Broadway production closed on 4 September 2016 after 800 performances.

UK Tours
The first UK and Ireland tour of the production began in December 2014 at the Lowry Theatre in Salford before completing a 32-city tour across the UK and Ireland.

A second UK and Ireland tour began in Salford in January 2017 and ran through to September 2017.

A third UK tour was set to begin in Salford in September 2020 and run until March 2021, with a seven-week run at the Troubadour Wembley Park Theatre in Wembley, London from November 2020 through to January 2021. However, due to the COVID-19 pandemic, this tour was delayed. The tour began officially at the Troubador Wembley Park Theatre from 20 November 2021 to 9 January 2022 before touring until May 2022.

US Tour

The first US national tour of the production began on 27 September 2016 at the Auditorium Theatre in Rochester, New York and closed in September 2017 at Segerstrom Center for the Arts, in Costa Mesa, California.

International Tour

The National Theatre opened its first international company in Amsterdam on 22 August 2017 with Joshua Jenkins (with Sam Newton and Kaffe Keating as alternatives at certain performances) as Christopher Boone, Julie Hale as Siobhan, Stuart Laing as Ed and Emma Beattie as Judy. Local producers then brought the production to Toronto, Melbourne, Hong Kong, Singapore, Beijing and Shanghai. Following the success of the Melbourne run, the same production began a national tour of Australia detailed below.

Australian Tour
The Australian premiere of the play took place at the Playhouse, Arts Centre in Melbourne as part of the first international tour. Following the success of the Melbourne season, the same production was announced to return to Australia on a national tour to the remaining major cities: Brisbane, Canberra, Sydney, Adelaide and Perth. The tour commenced on 12 June 2018 and will conclude on 19 August 2018. This is the original London production, produced by the National Theatre in partnership with Lunchbox Productions.

Mexico 
Before it opened on Broadway, it premiered in Mexico in 2013 with the name "El Curioso Incidente del Perro a Medianoche", thus becoming the first international production of the play. Luis Gerardo Méndez played the main character, alternating with Alfonso Dosal. The play ran in Mexico until 2015. This was not the same production as the original UK production.

Seoul
The third international production of the play played at the Kwanglim Art Center in Seoul, South Korea. Preview shows with the first-ever all Korean cast began on 27 November 2015, and ran until 31 January 2016. It is important to note this is not the same production as the original UK production.

South Africa
The South African premiere of the play took place in Cape Town, with a transfer to Johannesburg following the initial run. This was a new staging of the play by Paul Warwick-Griffin. The production team also included Gareth Hewitt Williams (lighting design), Tina Driedijk (scenic and costume design), and Charl-Johan Lingenfelder (original music and soundscapes).

Historical casting
The following tables show the casts of the principal original productions:

* - denotes the actor performing at certain performances

Notable replacements at the Apollo included Rakie Ayola as Siobhan, Amanda Drew as Judy and Daniel Casey as Roger Shears. On 13 September 2015 several members of the original Broadway cast performed their last show and were replaced on 15 September with a new cast. For its debut, the Korean production double- or triple-cast almost all of the main characters' roles.

Original London Creative Team 
The London production has retained the same creative team since 2012.

Awards and nominations
The nominations for the 2013 Laurence Olivier Awards, which recognise excellence in professional productions staged in London, were announced on 26 March 2013. The production secured the most nominations with eight, including Best New Play, Best Director (Elliott), Best Actor (Treadaway), Best Actress in a Supporting Role, and other categories including Best Set Design, Best Lighting Design, Best Sound Design and Best Choreographer. The production eventually won seven Olivier awards, thereby equalling Matilda the Musical's record win total in 2012. The play was also acclaimed with the Best New Play on 17 February 2013 at the Whatsonstage Awards.

The Play also earned 6 Tony Award nominations in 2015, winning 5, the most of any play that year.

West End production

Broadway production

Critical response

West End
Lyn Gardner of The Guardian wrote a rave review, commenting that "There are times when the show comes perilously close to sentimentality, but the clarity of Christopher's gaze is so unflinching that it often makes you uncomfortable, and the show is equally clear-eyed on the difficulties of parenting, messiness of life, and torment of a child who cannot bear to be touched. ... Leading a fine cast, Luke Treadaway is superb as Christopher, appealing and painful to watch, like the show itself."

Susannah Clapp, of The Observer, wrote in 2013, "The Curious Incident of the Dog in the Night-Time was one of the most original shows and startling successes at the National last year. It's hard to recall the surprise of this... Yet it at first seemed unlikely that Mark Haddon's novel about a boy with a mathematical gift and 'behavioural problems' could possibly work in the theatre." Paul Taylor of The Independent described the work as an "imaginative adaptation" and "brilliant production" saying that it was presented in a "fresh and arresting light" while balancing humor and tragedy. Taylor judged Treadaway's performance superlative citing, among other things, his rhythm, movements and delivery. Matt Wolf of The New York Times added that the play's debut was well-timed in relation to the 2012 London Summer Olympics: "its triumphalist spirit tallies exactly with the mood of this summer's athletic aspirations".

Ben Brantley, the chief theatre critic of The New York Times, wrote: "As directed by Marianne Elliott, working with an inspired set of designers, Christopher's maiden voyage into an alien metropolis becomes a virtuoso study in sensory overload. Those lights, noises, street signs, road maps, random words that spell themselves into being, and, oh yes, that moving staircase that materializes out of nowhere: it all keeps coming at you". Brantley went on to say that the "extraordinary accomplishment" of the play "is that it forces you to look at the world through Christopher's order-seeking eyes. In doing so you're likely to reconsider the dauntless battle your own mind is always waging against the onslaught of stimuli that is life. Scary, isn't it? Exhilarating too."

Charles Spencer of The Daily Telegraph, on the other hand, thought that Siobhan's turning the book Christopher writes into a play "may sound cumbersome but it works superbly".  Like others, Spencer praised Treadaway: "He is unbearably poignant in moments of distress when he kneels with his face on the ground and moans, but also movingly captures the character's courage, his brilliance at mathematics, and his startling perspectives on the world ... thanks to Treadaway's pained honesty and twitchy awkwardness, as well as his moments of exultant joy, Christopher Boone feels like both a hero and a friend, though the happy ending is rightly qualified." Spencer also praised Gleason and Cusack.

Broadway
Richard Zoglin of Time described the play as "a demonstration of the power of theater to transport us to exotic places". Steven Suskin, drama critic for The Huffington Post, said the play entertains, illuminates, and brings us to an exalted new place. Adam Green of Vogue says the play is "a testament to the singular power of theater". Brantley, in his review of the New York production, called the work "manipulative", writing that it "retunes the way you see and hear" by forcing you to embrace a heightened sensory perception along with the main protagonist. Elysa Gardner of USA Today described the experience of viewing the play as a journey "inside Christopher's gifted, troubled mind using inventive visual and sonic effects". She lauded Sharp's "movement, expressions and voice making the boy's terrors and his ferocious intelligence seem equally natural".

Peter Marks of The Washington Post praised the visual graphics of the show as being better presented than the "textual and performance elements" noting that the working of Boone's brain upstaged the detective work of finding the killer. Jennifer Farrar of the Associated Press thought the show a "charming, intricately choreographed and dynamic theatrical experience" and that Alex Sharp's presentation of Christopher exemplifies the life skill of overcoming personal challenge.  Deadline Hollywood'''s Jeremy Gerard felt that the production combines the obsessed math prodigy element of A Beautiful Mind with the mentoring compassion of Billy Elliot. Joe Dziemianowicz of The Daily News found Sharp's performance "dazzling" and "physical and emotionally intense" and praised the design, lighting, music and video displays.

Terry Teachout, drama critic for The Wall Street Journal dissented, describing the "fantastically elaborate video projections" pejoratively, saying that they are smothering. He felt the show was popular because of the trendy nature of Asperger's syndrome and that it was too reliant on trickery. His Wall Street Journal'' colleague Stefanie Cohen thought the play suffered from difficulty in adapting the book to the stage.

References

External links
 Official Broadway show website
  (archived)
 
 Official Touring Website UK

Plays by Simon Stephens
Broadway plays
West End plays
Plays and musicals about disability
Autism in the arts
Plays based on novels
Plays set in England
Tony Award-winning plays
Laurence Olivier Award-winning plays
Drama Desk Award-winning plays
Warner Bros. Theatrical
2012 plays